The Bennett Range is a subrange of the Tagish Highland, located on the west side of Bennett Lake in Yukon and British Columbia, Canada.

Name origin
The lake from which the range name comes was named in 1883 by Frederick Schwatka, US Army officer and explorer, after James Gordon Bennett Jr (1841–1918), editor of the New York Herald, who was sponsor of Schwatchka's search for the remains of the Franklin Expedition, 1878–81.

References

Mountain ranges of British Columbia
Mountain ranges of Yukon